Hot Country Songs is a chart that ranks the top-performing country music songs in the United States, published by Billboard magazine.  In 2002, 21 different songs topped the chart, then published under the title Hot Country Singles & Tracks, in 52 issues of the magazine, based on weekly airplay data from country music radio stations compiled by Nielsen Broadcast Data Systems.

Singer Alan Jackson's song "Where Were You (When the World Stopped Turning)" was at number one at the start of the year, having been at the top since the issue dated December 29, 2001, and remained at number one until the issue dated February 2, when it was replaced by "Good Morning Beautiful" by Steve Holy.  This marked Holy's first appearance at the top of the Hot Country Singles & Tracks chart.  Other acts who reached the number one position for the first time in 2002 included Darryl Worley with "I Miss My Friend", Chris Cagle with "I Breathe In, I Breathe Out" and Rascal Flatts with "These Days".  Additionally, while not his first number one, when Tracy Byrd topped the chart in October with "Ten Rounds with José Cuervo", it marked his first appearance at the top of the chart for more than nine years, as well as the first number one for songwriter Casey Beathard.

The longest unbroken run at number one during 2002 was seven weeks, achieved by Kenny Chesney's song "The Good Stuff", which was also ranked number one on Billboard's year-end chart of the most popular country songs.  Two artists achieved three number one hits during 2002.  Tim McGraw topped the chart in March with "Bring On the Rain", a collaboration with Jo Dee Messina, which was replaced at the top the following week by his single "The Cowboy in Me".  Later in the year he returned to the number one position with "Unbroken".  Toby Keith reached number one with "My List", "Courtesy of the Red, White and Blue (The Angry American)" and "Who's Your Daddy?".  McGraw and Keith's singles contributed to a dominance of the chart in 2002 by male vocalists.  Other than Messina's collaboration with McGraw, the only number one by a female artist was "Blessed" by Martina McBride, which would be the last number one for a solo female artist for more than two years.  The final number one hit of the year was "She'll Leave You with a Smile" by George Strait.

Chart history

See also
2002 in music
List of artists who reached number one on the U.S. country chart

References

2002
2002 record charts
2002 in American music